Bistorta macrophylla (syn. Polygonum macrophyllum, syn. Persicaria macrophylla) is a flowering plant species in the buckwheat family Polygonaceae. It is native to mountain regions of West and South China (Gansu, Guizhou, Henan, Hubei, Qinghai, Shaanxi, Sichuan, Tibet, Yunnan), Bhutan, Nepal, northern India (Himachal Pradesh, Uttarakhand), and Pakistan.

In Nepal, its rhizomes are dried to be used as food.

In India (Uttarakhand), its leaves are used in traditional medicine to treat wounds. The paste made from the roots is given to infants for stomach problems.

Vernacular names:
 English: red knotweed or large leaved knotweed
 
 Nepali: Dalle ghans, Dalle jhar
 India: Kukhri, Chhota ninayin, Kande-re-ninai

Compounds (-)-Epicatechin-5-O-beta-D-glucopyranoside, (+)-catechin-7-O-beta-D-glucopyranoside, 1-(3-O-beta-D-glucopyranosyl 4,5-dihydroxy-phenyl)-ethanone, (-)-epicatechin, chlorogenic acid and gallic acid can be found in the species.

References

External links 

 efloras.org

macrophylla
Flora of China
Flora of West Himalaya
Flora of East Himalaya
Flora of Nepal
Flora of Pakistan
Plants described in 1974
Taxa named by David Don